Rokietnica may refer to:

Rokietnica, Subcarpathian Voivodeship
Gmina Rokietnica, Subcarpathian Voivodeship
Rokietnica, Greater Poland Voivodeship
Gmina Rokietnica, Greater Poland Voivodeship

See also
Gmina Rokietnica (disambiguation)